Juander Santos Aquino (born 7 May 1995 in Bayaguana) is a Dominican athlete specialising in the 400 metres and 400 metres hurdles. He has won several international medals, mainly in the relay.

He is the younger brother of 400m specialist and Olympic silver medalist, Luguelín Santos.

Competition record

Personal bests
Outdoor
200 metres – 20.94 (-1.2 m/s) (Guatemala City 2014)
400 metres – 45.93 (Xalapa 2014)
400 metres hurdles – 48.59 (London 2017)

References

1995 births
Living people
Dominican Republic male hurdlers
Dominican Republic male sprinters
World Athletics Championships athletes for the Dominican Republic
Athletes (track and field) at the 2015 Pan American Games
Athletes (track and field) at the 2019 Pan American Games
Pan American Games competitors for the Dominican Republic
Universiade medalists in athletics (track and field)
People from Monte Plata Province
Central American and Caribbean Games silver medalists for the Dominican Republic
Central American and Caribbean Games bronze medalists for the Dominican Republic
Competitors at the 2014 Central American and Caribbean Games
Competitors at the 2018 Central American and Caribbean Games
Universiade gold medalists for the Dominican Republic
Central American and Caribbean Games medalists in athletics
Medalists at the 2017 Summer Universiade
Medalists at the 2015 Summer Universiade